Gymnocalycium, commonly called chin cactus, is a genus of about 70 South American species of cactus. The genus name Gymnocalycium (from Greek, "naked calyx") refers to the flower buds bearing no hair or spines.

Their main area of distribution is Argentina, part of Uruguay, Paraguay, southern Bolivia and part of Brazil. Most species are rather small varying from 4 to 15 centimetres in size. In cultivation they are popular for their easy flowering habits, and the flowers are generally brightly coloured. Where temperatures fall below  they must be cultivated under glass with heat.

Species

Gallery

References

External links
SucculentCity: Gymnocalycium Page
The genus Gymnocalycium: Genus & Species information

 
Cactoideae genera
Cacti of South America
Flora of Argentina
Flora of Bolivia
Flora of Brazil
Flora of Paraguay
Flora of Uruguay
Garden plants of South America